William Wirt Allen (September 11, 1835 – November 21, 1894) was a Brigadier general in the Confederate States Army during the American Civil War. He rose through the ranks to command a division in the Cavalry Corps of the Army of Tennessee in the last days of the war.

Early life and career
William W. Allen was born in New York City, New York to Wade Hampton Allen, a successful businessman with agricultural interests in the South, and Eliza Sayre Allen on September 11, 1835. Shortly after his birth, the family moved to Montgomery, Alabama, where he was educated before entering Princeton College in New Jersey. After graduation in 1854, he studied law, but chose instead to return to plantation life. On August 13, 1857, in Montgomery, he married Susan P. Ball (1840–1915), and they raised eleven children.

Civil War service
After Alabama passed its Ordinance of Secession and Fort Sumter was fired upon, Allen enlisted in the newly raised Confederate army and was elected as a lieutenant in Company A, Montgomery Mounted Rifles. The following year, when the state organized the 1st Alabama Cavalry, Allen became its first major on March 18, 1862, and saw action at the Battle of Shiloh in April along the Tennessee River. He was subsequently promoted to colonel of the regiment before the Kentucky Campaign, and led the 1st Alabama Cavalry at the Battle of Perryville, where he received a slight wound. Later that year, he was severely wounded in the Battle of Murfreesboro while in command of a brigade.

Out of action for over a year while recuperating from surgery which left him little use of his right hand, Allen returned to field duty in early 1864. On February 26 of that year, he was promoted to brigadier general and took command of a brigade of cavalry at Dalton, Georgia. His brigade was composed of the 1st, 3rd, 4th, 9th, 12th, and 51st Alabama Cavalry regiments, and they served in the corps of Joseph Wheeler in the Army of Tennessee. Allen led the brigade throughout the Alabama Campaign. In August, a Georgia cavalry brigade was added to Allen's force, and later, Anderson's Brigade. Allen, now in charge of a full division, participated in the Atlanta Campaign in the summer, as well as contesting Sherman's March to the Sea (Savannah Campaign).

Although Confederate President Jefferson Davis appointed him a major general in February, 1865, the Confederate Senate did not confirm his promotion before that body met for the last time. In early 1865, Allen's Division fought in the Carolinas Campaign. Allen and his men surrendered at Concord, North Carolina, on May 3. He was paroled shortly thereafter as a brigadier general.

Postbellum career
Allen returned home to Alabama and resumed his agricultural pursuits. He was also involved in the railroad industry and later served as the state's Adjutant General during the administration of President Grover Cleveland. He also was for a time a United States Marshal in Alabama. Allen helped found and organize the Confederate Survivors Association of Montgomery. His bullet-holed uniform coat and his battle-flag are buried in the cornerstone of the Confederate monument in Montgomery.

In 1893, William W. Allen moved to Sheffield, Alabama, where he died of heart disease the following year. He is buried in Birmingham's Elmwood Cemetery.

The Maj. Gen. William Wirt Allen, Chapter 199, of the Military Order of the Stars and Bars is named in his honor and memory.

See also

List of American Civil War generals (Confederate)

Notes

References
 Banta, Theodore M., Sayre Family: Lineage of Thomas Sayre, a Founder of Southampton. New York: De Vinne Press, 1901.
 Eicher, John H., and David J. Eicher, Civil War High Commands. Stanford: Stanford University Press, 2001. .
 Evans, Clement A., "Alabama & Mississippi by General Joseph Wheeler," Confederate Military History: Vol. XII. Atlanta: Confederate Publishing Company, 1899.
 Sifakis, Stewart. Who Was Who in the Civil War. New York: Facts On File, 1988. .
 Warner, Ezra J. Generals in Gray: Lives of the Confederate Commanders. Baton Rouge: Louisiana State University Press, 1959. .

External links

 MOS&B biographical page on General Allen
 
 

1835 births
1894 deaths
American planters
American slave owners
Burials at Elmwood Cemetery (Birmingham, Alabama)
Confederate States Army major generals
Military personnel from Montgomery, Alabama
People of Alabama in the American Civil War
Princeton University alumni
United States Marshals